Santa Lucia, also called the Chiesa dell'Adorazione Perpetua is a Roman Catholic church located in the city of Padua, region of Veneto, Italy.

History
A church at the site was present since the 10th century. It was rebuilt in the late 17th-century using designs by Gerolamo Frigimelica, and completed by Sante Bonato. The brick façade has four columns of composite order. Flanking the portal are statues of Saints Peter and Paul by Giovanni Bonazza, and St Bartholemew by Giovanni's son, Antonio Bonazza. The statues of Saints Luke, Cristopher, Matthew, John, and Joseph were completed by Antonio da Verona.

Inside, the church houses an altarpiece depicting the Incredulity of St Thomas by Alessandro Varotari; and in the presbytery, an altarpiece depicting the Church in Prayer and the Glory of the Eucharist (1959) by Amleto Sartori. Also in the presbytery is a St Luke by Giovanni Battista Tiepolo.

To the left of the facade when facing the entrance of the church is the Oratory of San Rocco with 16th-century frescoes.

References

Roman Catholic churches in Padua
Baroque architecture in Veneto
18th-century Roman Catholic church buildings in Italy